Phymatodes decussatus is a species of beetle in the family Cerambycidae. It was described by John Lawrence LeConte in 1857.

References

Phymatodes
Beetles described in 1857